Edith Wilson Miles (born Edith Margaret Wilson) is a biochemist known for her work on the structure and function of enzymes, especially her work on tryptophan synthase.

Education and career 
Miles received her B.A. from the University of Texas at Austin in 1957, and then moved to the University of California, Berkeley where she earned a Ph.D. in 1962 working in Esmond Emerson Snell's lab with Jesse Rabinowitz and Edward Adelberg as her advisors. With funding from the American Cancer Soceity, she moved to the University of Leicester as a postdoctoral researcher with Hans Kornberg. From 1964 until 1966, she was a postdoctoral investigator at Tufts University working with Alton Meister, and then she accepted an independent position at the National Institutes of Health. In 2000 she became a Scientist Emeritus.

Research 
Wilson's graduate research characterized an enzyme that required pyridoxal phosphate and tetrahydrofolate to convert -methylserine to alanine and formaldehyde. Her subsequent work examined the glyoxylate cycle in bacterial cells and led to further investigation of enzymes that require pyridoxal phosphate. Upon her move to the National Institutes of Health, she began to focus on tryptophan synthase, first by establishing the mechanism of the enzyme which would later allow her to investigate interactions between the subunits of the enzyme. Wilson went on to use x-ray crystallography to obtain the structure of the enzyme, and used mutant forms of Salmonella typhimurium to identify the significant components of the enzyme. She also showed that   complex of tryptophan synthase could unfold in the presence of guanine hydrochloride, details about protein folding and shape that became relevant in later research about barrel-shaped proteins.

Selected publications

Awards and honors 
While at the University of Texas at Austin, Miles (then known as Edith Margaret Wilson) was inducted into Alpha Lambda Delta, an honor society that recognizes achievement of first year university students and for which she later served as secretary. In her senior year, 1957, she was elected to Phi Beta Kappaand was a member of Mortar Board. In 1994, Miles received the Hillebrand Award, named for William Francis Hillebrand, from the Chemical Society of Washington, a section of the American Chemical Society.

Personal life 
Her husband, H. Todd Miles, also worked at the National Institutes of Health and became Scientist Emeritus in 2000.

References 

University of Texas at Austin alumni
University of California, Berkeley alumni
National Institutes of Health faculty
Women biochemists
Living people
21st-century American women
Year of birth missing (living people)